Saheefa Jabbar Khattak (born 1 October 1988) is a Pakistani model turned actress. After receiving an award for Best Emerging Model at Lux Style Awards and Hum Awards, Khattak ventured into acting by playing the leading lady in the 2018 television serials Teri Meri Kahani and Beti. Both of which earned her critical acclaim.

Life and career
Khattak was born into a Pathan 
family in Khanewal, Punjab. Khattak grew up in Lahore with her parents and a younger brother. She holds BS in Business Economics from Beaconhouse National University Lahore. In December 2017, she married  Khawaja Khizer Hussain. According to Khattak, she met him during her university days. They married in an Islamic wedding ceremony. The ceremony was held at Lahore, Pakistan.

Khattak started her career as a fashion model and appeared in several television commercials. She is noted for her short hair looks on the ramp. After receiving an award for Best Emerging Talent at Lux Style Awards and Hum Awards, she move on to acting and made her debut with Momina Duraid's Teri Meri Kahani where she played a lead character of Deena opposite Azfar Rehman and Saboor Aly. The serial ran for 36 Episodes on Hum TV. It was followed by another lead role in ARY Digital's social drama Beti. An Idream Entertainment's production, Beti was a critical and commercially hit. Her role as Mariam was praised by critics.

Television

Awards and nominations

References

External links

1993 births
Living people
Pakistani television actresses
21st-century Pakistani actresses
Pakistani female models